The Hindu Succession (Amendment) Act, 2005, an amendment to the Hindu Succession Act, 1956, received the assent from President of India on 5 September 2005 and was given effect from 9 September 2005. It was essentially meant for removing gender stereotype provisions regarding property rights in the Hindu Succession Act, 1956. It was a revolutionary step in the field of Indian legislation regarding rights of women in India.

Key amendments

Amendment of section 4 of the principal Act
In section 4 of the Hindu Succession Act, 1956, sub-section (2) has been omitted.

Amendment of Section 6 of the principal Act 
Section 6 in the principal act has been substituted by the amended provision. The amended provision under section 6 of the principal act in essence defines as follows:-ment of the Hindu Succession (Amendment) Act, 2005, the pious obligation of a son, grandson or great-grandson for the recovery of any debt due from his father, grandfather or great-grandfather under the Hindu law, came to an end

Exception 
The amendment, under clause 5 of section 6 provides an exception as follows:

 Nothing contained in this section shall apply to a partition, which has been effected before the 20th day of December, 2004.
 
Explanation - For the purposes of this section "partition" means any partition made by execution of a deed of partition duly registered under the Registration Act, 1908  or partition effected by a decree of a court

Key features & effect 
The amendment has tremendously balanced the property rights of male and female siblings. In 2008, the Supreme Court ruled that the law has retrospective effect, and for the daughter to become a co-sharer with her male siblings, the father does not have to be alive on 9 September 2005. The Supreme Court also ruled that the amendment was applicable to all partition suits filed before 2005 and pending when the amendment was framed.

 This amendment is in consonance with the right of equality as enshrined under Article 14, 15, & 21 of the constitution of India.

References

Acts of the Parliament of India 2005
Indian family law
Women's rights in India
Women's rights legislation